Hearts Once Nourished with Hope and Compassion is the first full-length album by American hardcore punk band Shai Hulud, released on November 4, 1997, on Crisis Records. Hearts Once Nourished with Hope and Compassion received positive reviews and became very influential in the emerging metalcore scene of the late 1990s.

Production
Shai Hulud started recording the album in August 1997 and finished the process in September. The album's title name comes from the lyrics of "Outside the Boundaries of a Friend", My heart, once nourished with hope and compassion, now is black as death.

Many movie samples were used. One of them is played at the end of "Solely Concentrating on the Negative Aspects of Life", in which Bill Murray is heard saying "It's gonna be cold. It's gonna be gray. And it's gonna last you for the rest of your life" from the 1993 film Groundhog Day. Sigourney Weaver in Alien (1979) is heard at the end of the record saying, "This is Lieutenant Ripley, last survivor of the Nostromo, signing off."

Early versions of "Beyond Man" ("Favor") and "For the World" ("Sauve Qui Peut" (Save Yourself, in literal translation from French) are found in A Comprehensive Retrospective: Or How I Learned to Stop Worrying and Release Bad and Useless Recordings compilation. off the 1995 demo. Damien Moyal, the former vocalist of the band, still has a "Sauve Qui Peut" tattoo on his arm.

The techno/industrial version of "If Born From This Soil", entitled "If Born From This Soil: Treatments for the Infected Foetus", was arranged by Jonathan Wright and his project, Minor Procedure.

In the thanks list, the hardcore band Will Haven is thanked twice.

The album was released in CD/LP and 12" clear brown (106 press). It is now sold through Crisis subsidiary, Revelation Records.

Sound 
The album's blend of melody and aggression, typical in modern hardcore bands, became very influential for many successful mainstream hardcore bands and much of the hardcore-metalcore scene in the 2000s, even though guitarist Matt Fox has stated on interviews that he disliked the final product and its sound quality.

Lyrical themes 
Lyrical themes vary from misanthropy, angst, hatred, and failed romantic love. These themes give the album an overall dark atmosphere. In further releases, the band would focus even more on misanthropy and hatred themes.

The lyrics of "Outside the Boundaries of a Friend" are directly inspired by an unrequited love of guitarist Matt Fox, and "Eating Bullets of Acceptance" talks about how, in the words of Dave Silber, "some vegans idealise and have a sense of superiority over others".

Music videos
A fan music video was made for "My Heart Bleeds the Darkest Blood" in 1998, during the US tour with Overcast.

Reissues
The album was remixed and released as an enhanced with new artwork on August 29, 2006. The enhanced features are the original releases' MP3s, before the remastering process.

Track listing
Credits are adapted from the album's liner notes.

Credits
Chad Gilbert - vocals
Matt Fox - guitar
Oliver Chapoy - guitar
Dave Silber - bass guitar
Steve Kleisath - drums
Damien Moyal - lyrics
Mitchell Howell - engineer
Dustin Moore - cover art, photographs
Alexis Neptune - cover art, concept
Autumn Horne - cover art, concept
Recorded and mixed at Morrisound Studios, Tampa, Florida
Remastered and remixed by Zeuss at Planet-Z

References

Shai Hulud albums
1997 debut albums
Revelation Records albums